There are many knots used in climbing, rappelling and mountaineering. Popular climbing knots are briefly described and depicted in this article.

References

External links 

 Rock climbing knots Knots used in climbing and mountaineering
 Grog's Index of Climbing Knots

 
Climbing and mountaineering-related lists